Aman Giri (born 1 June 1996) is an Indian politician. He represented the Gola Gokrannath Assembly constituency in Gola Gokarannath, Lakhimpur district of Uttar Pradesh.

Political career
Giri contested 2022 Uttar Pradesh Legislative Assembly election as Bharatiya Janata Party candidate from Gola Gokrannath Assembly constituency and defeated his close contestant Vinay Tiwari from Samajwadi Party with a margin of 90,542 votes. From 6 November 2022 he has become member of the 18th Legislative Assembly of Uttar Pradesh

Posts held

References

1996 births
People from Lakhimpur Kheri district
Uttar Pradesh MLAs 2022–2027
Bharatiya Janata Party politicians from Uttar Pradesh
Living people